

Calling formats

00              International Direct Dialing code

List of area codes in Ceuta

References
Ceuta dialing codes - accessed 3 May 2010.

Ceuta
Telecommunications in Spain
Telephone numbers